Surjoux-Lhôpital is a commune in the Ain department in eastern France. It is the result of the merger, on 1 January 2019, of the communes of Surjoux and Lhôpital.

See also
Communes of the Ain department

References

Communes of Ain
Communes nouvelles of Ain
Populated places established in 2019
2019 establishments in France